Ocimum kilimandscharicum, also known as camphor basil, is a basil species native to Kenya, Tanzania, Uganda, Sudan, and Ethiopia.

References

kilimandscharicum
Herbs
Flora of Ethiopia
Flora of Kenya
Flora of Sudan
Flora of Tanzania
Flora of Uganda
Garden plants
Plants described in 1895